The Aberdeen River is a tributary of the rivière aux Castors Noirs, flowing in the town of La Tuque and in the municipality of Lac-Édouard, in Haute-Batiscanie, in Mauricie, in the province of Quebec, in Canada.

This hydrographic slope is served by some forest roads.

Forestry is the main economic activity in the sector; recreational activities, second.

The surface of the Aberdeen River (except rapids) is generally frozen from early December to late March, but safe circulation on the ice is generally from late December to early March. The water level of the river varies with the seasons and the precipitation.

Geography 
The Aberdeen River originates from Aberdeen Lake in the city's territory from La Tuque. This long, landlocked lake is mainly fed by seven discharges from the surrounding mountains. Its outfall is located at the bottom of a small bay in the southeastern part of the lake.

The Aberdeen River flows to the bottom of a bay on the eastern shore of Lac aux Biscuits.

Toponymy 
Aberdeen is the third largest city in Scotland, located in the north-east of Great Britain, on the banks of the North Sea. In Canada, the term Aberdeen is included in some 50 toponyms.

The toponym “Aberdeen River” was formalized on December 5, 1968 in the Place Names Bank of the Commission de toponymie du Québec.

See also 

 La Tuque, a city
 Lac-Édouard, a municipality
 Aberdeen Lake
 Lac aux Biscuits
 Batiscanie
 Batiscan River
 Rivière aux Castors Noirs
 List of rivers of Quebec

Notes and references 

Rivers of Mauricie
La Tuque, Quebec